Pine Creek is a  tributary to the Upper Iowa River in northeastern Iowa; see Pine Creek (Canoe Creek tributary) for the smaller nearby stream of the same name. It rises in southern Fillmore County, Minnesota, between Harmony and Canton, crossing into Winneshiek County, Iowa, in Burr Oak Township in a southwest to southeast direction. It joins the Upper Iowa near Bluffton in Bluffton Township. Its course is essentially rural, with some cleared farmland, but also forested.

See also
List of rivers of Iowa

Sources

Tributaries of the Upper Iowa River
Rivers of Iowa
Rivers of Minnesota
Rivers of Winneshiek County, Iowa
Rivers of Fillmore County, Minnesota